Christopher or Chris Davis may refer to:

Sports

American football
 Chris Davis (running back) (born 1979), American football fullback
 Chris Davis (wide receiver, born 1983), American football wide receiver
 Chris Davis (wide receiver, born 1984), American football wide receiver
 Chris Davis (cornerback) (born 1990), American football cornerback

Other sports
 Chris Davis (baseball) (born 1986), Major League Baseball player
 Chris Davis (fighter) (born 1982), American mixed martial artist
 Chris Davis, Canadian ice hockey player  drafted by the Buffalo Sabres in 1993
 Christopher Martin Davis (born 1994), Bulgarian ice dancer

Other
 Christopher James Davis (1842–1870), doctor and member of the Plymouth Brethren
 Christopher Lawrence Davis (1875–1951), American farmer, businessman, and politician
 Chris Davis (politician) (born 1953), Liberal National Party of Queensland politician
 Christopher Davis (politician), Connecticut state legislator
 Christopher Davis (writer) (born 1953), American author
 Chris Davis (musician), British singer and guitarist
 Jon Christopher Davis, American singer songwriter
 Chris Davis, guitarist for the band Texas in July
 Lynching of Christopher Davis

See also 
 Christopher Davies (disambiguation)
 Christine Davis (disambiguation)
 Christina Davis (disambiguation)
 Khris Davis (born 1987), American professional baseball player
 Khris Davis (actor), American actor
 Kris Davis (born 1980), Canadian jazz pianist and composer